The Public Broadcasting Company of Ukraine, shortened to Suspilne Ukraine (from ) or UA:PBC, is the national public broadcaster in Ukraine. As such it was registered on 19 January 2017. In its revamped form the company provides content for its three television and radio channels.

Ukrainian Radio was its radio predecessor and a stand-alone company until it merged with NTU to be the first public broadcasting company of Ukraine.

Radio broadcasts in Ukraine, at the time part of the USSR, began in Kharkiv in 1924, and a nationwide radio network was initiated in 1928. (In the first years of the USSR Kharkiv was the capital of Ukraine, from December 1919 to January 1934, after which the capital relocated to Kyiv.) In 1965 the first nationwide Ukrainian television channel Ukraiinske Telebachennia or UT (‘Ukrainian Television’) was established. (Ukraine was part of the USSR from 1920 until it declared its independence  on 24 August 1991.)

The broadcaster was rebranded to Suspilne on 5 December 2019, with the new brand identity presented on 23 May 2022.

Overview 
The Public Broadcasting Company of Ukraine is a public joint-stock agency with 100% of its shares belonging to the state, and operates the television channel Pershyi, the only Ukrainian TV channel that has a coverage over 97% of Ukraine's territory and is the only state-owned national channel. Its programs are oriented at all social layers of the Ukrainian society and national minorities.

Its radio division Ukrainian Radio is the biggest radio network in the country, which broadcasts on FM (covers 192 settlements in 24 regions) and AM, satellite and cable networks throughout Ukraine, and is the most popular news and talk radio station in Ukraine.

Among priority directions of the network are informative publicism, popular scientific, culturologic, entertaining and sport-oriented ones. Pershyi, at one point, significantly trails all of its privately owned rival channels in terms of viewership. The National Television Company of Ukraine (NTCU) was changed to Public Television Network in 2009. The network consists of several channels such as Pershyi, "Second Channel", "Euronews Ukraine" and "Ukraine and the World". In 2014, a new law was passed to make the network independent from the government. With the creation of the Public Broadcasting Company of Ukraine in 2015, the National Radio Company of Ukraine merged into this new company, which was officially registered on 19 January 2017.

Television 
Currently the Suspilne network is organized into the following:

Nationwide 
Pershyi
Suspilne Kultura

Regional channels 
Suspilne Crimea (Autonomous Republic of Crimea)
Suspilne Cherkasy (formerly Ros) (Cherkasy Oblast)
Suspilne Chernihiv (formerly Siver) (Chernihiv Oblast)
Suspilne Chernivtsi (formerly Bukovina) (Chernivtsi Oblast)
Suspilne Donbas (formerly DoTB in Donetsk Oblast and LOT in Luhansk Oblast) (Donetsk and Luhansk Oblast)
Suspilne Dnipro (formerly 51) (Dnipropetrovsk Oblast)
Suspilne Ivano-Frankivsk (formerly Karpaty) (Ivano-Frankivsk Oblast)
Suspilne Kharkiv (formerly OTB) (Kharkiv Oblast)
Suspilne Kherson (formerly Skifiya) (Kherson Oblast)
Suspilne Khmelnytskyi (formerly Podillya-Centr) (Khmelnytskyi Oblast)
Suspilne Kyiv (formerly Centralnyi Kanal) (Kyiv and Kyiv Oblast)
Suspilne Kropyvnytskyi (formerly Kirovohrad) (Kirovohrad Oblast)
Suspilne Lviv (formerly TRC Lviv) (Lviv Oblast)
Suspilne Mykolaiv (formerly Mykolaiv) (Mykolaiv Oblast)
Suspilne Odesa (formerly ODT) (Odesa Oblast)
Suspilne Poltava (formerly Ltava) (Poltava Oblast)
Suspilne Rivne (formerly RTB) (Rivne Oblast)
Suspilne Sumy (Sumy Oblast)
Suspilne Ternopil (formerly TTB) (Ternopil Oblast)
Suspilne Vinntysa (formerly Vintera) (Vinnytsia Oblast)
Suspilne Lutsk (formerly Nova Volyn) (Volyn Oblast)
Suspilne Uzhhorod (formerly Tysa-1) (Zakarpattia Oblast)
Suspilne Zaporizhzhia (formerly Zaporizhzhia) (Zaporizhzhia Oblast)
Suspilne Zhytomyr (formerly Zhytomyr) (Zhytomyr Oblast)

Radio 

Suspilne broadcasts on 3 national and 1 international radio channels: Ukrainian Radio (First Channel, UR-1), Radio "Promin", Radio "Culture" and Radio Ukraine International. The regional branches have their broadcasting slots in the broadcast schedule of the First Channel of Ukrainian Radio. General producer of Ukrainian radio channels since 2017 is Dmytro Khorkin.

Ukrainian Radio Directorate of the Suspilne is a structural subdivision of the company, which integrates four broadcasting channels, the studios of Radio House and the House of Recording of Ukrainian Radio, and 5 radio ensembles.

Ukrainian radio broadcasts on FM and AM, satellite and cable TV-networks throughout Ukraine. Also it has mobile app suspilne.radio for Android and iOS.

Radio channels 

Ukrainian Radio (UR-1) – the first channel of public Ukrainian Radio. The most popular news and talk radio station in Ukraine. Also it is the biggest FM radio network in the country: 192 settlements in 24 regions.
  (UR-2) – the second channel of public Ukrainian Radio. Music and talk radio station. 
  (UR-3) – the third channel of public Ukrainian Radio. Cultural and educational radio station. 
Radio Ukraine International (RUI) – international service in Russian, Romanian, English, Ukrainian and German.

Studio complexes 

 Ukrainian Radio House – is a studio complex located at 26 Khreschatyk str, Kyiv. It's a broadcasting center for four channels of Ukrainian radio.
 Recording House of Ukrainian Radio – is a concert and studio complex in Kyiv. Large Concert Studio of the Recording House allows to record large orchestral and choral groups and is one of the largest such studios in Europe. The Recording House also serves as a rehearsal and concert venue for radio orchestras and ensembles of Ukrainian Radio.

Radio ensembles 
Radio ensembles are instrumental or vocal bands – i.e. radio orchestra – employed by public service broadcasters around the world, whose main tasks are to create stock records for broadcasting on public radio stations, as well as to promote national culture. The following radio ensembles are a part of Suspilne:

 Ukrainian Radio Symphony Orchestra
 Ukrainian Radio Choir Chapel
 Ukrainian Radio Orchestra of folk and popular music
 Ukrainian Radio Big Children Choir
 Ukrainian radio Trio of Bandurists

Managers

Presidents (2005–2010)
 June 1, 1995 – August 21, 1996: Oleksandr Savenko
 August 21, 1996 – November 18, 1996: Zynoviy Kulyk (interim)
 November 18, 1996 – October 1, 1998: Viktor Leshyk
 October 5, 1998 – November 17, 1998: Mykola Kniazhytskyi
 November 17, 1998 – June 21, 1999: Zynoviy Kulyk
 June 21, 1999 –  July 15, 1999: Oleksandr Savenko (interim)
 July 16, 1999 – November 19, 2001: Vadym Dolhanov
 November 19, 2001 – March 28, 2003: Ihor Storozhuk
 March 28, 2003 – February 25, 2005: Oleksandr Savenko (second term)
 February 25, 2005 – September 8, 2005: Taras Stetskiv
 October 27, 2005 – February 18, 2008: Vitaliy Dokalenko
 February 25, 2008 – March 17, 2010: Vasyl Ilaschuknj

Directors general (2010–16)
 March 17, 2010 – February 20, 2013: Yehor Benkendorf
 February 20, 2013 – March 24, 2014: Oleksandr Panteleymonov (interim)
 March 25, 2014 – November 1, 2016: Zurab Alasania

Chairmen of the board (2017–present)
 January 18, 2017 – May 13, 2017: Hanna Bychok (acting)
 May 13, 2017 – June 24, 2019: Zurab Alasania
 May 10, 2019 – June 30, 2019: Mykola Chernotytskyi (acting)
 July 1, 2019 – April 26, 2021: Zurab Alasania
 April 27, 2021 – present: Mykola Chernotytskyi

Notes
 1.The Supervisory board of UA꞉PBC decided to break the contract with Zurab Alasania effective May 6, 2019. However Alasania took vacation and thus his firing was postponed. Nevertheless both Alasania for the period of his vacation and the Supervisory Board after breaking of the contract with him assigned Mykola Chernotytskyi as acting chairman of the board. Alasania has been later renewed on his position by Shevchenkivskyi District court of the city of Kyiv.

See also 
Television in Ukraine

References

External links

State companies of Ukraine
Eastern Bloc mass media
European Broadcasting Union members
Television networks in Ukraine
Ukrainian brands
Television channels and stations established in 1965
1965 establishments in Ukraine
2017 establishments in Ukraine
Government-owned companies of Ukraine
Institutions with the title of National in Ukraine
Publicly funded broadcasters